iOS 13 is the thirteenth major release of the iOS mobile operating system developed by Apple Inc. for their iPhone, iPod Touch and HomePod lines. The successor to iOS 12 on those devices, it was announced at the company's Worldwide Developers Conference (WWDC) on June 3, 2019, and released on September 19, 2019. It was succeeded by iOS 14, released on September 16, 2020.

As of iOS 13, the iPad lines run a separate operating system, derived from iOS, named iPadOS. Both iPadOS 13 and iOS 13 dropped support for devices with less than 2 GB of RAM.

Overview 

iOS 13 and iPadOS 13 were introduced by Senior Vice President of Software Engineering Craig Federighi at the WWDC keynote address on June 3, 2019.

The first beta was made available to registered developers after the keynote. The second beta was released to registered developers on June 18, 2019, and the first public beta was released on June 24, 2019. The initial release of iOS 13 was version 13.0, which was released to the public on September 19, 2019.

System features

Privacy 
iOS 13 changes the handling of location data. When an app requests access to location, the user chooses whether to grant access whenever they are using the app, never, or only once. The user will receive similar prompts for background location access, and when an app requests access to Bluetooth or Wi-Fi (which may also be used for non-consensual location tracking).

In August 2019, it was reported that beginning in April 2020, the PushKit API for VoIP would be restricted to internet telephone usage, closing a "loophole" that had been used by other apps for background data collection.

User interface 
A system-wide dark mode allows users to enable a light-on-dark color scheme for the entire iOS and iPadOS user interface, all native applications, and supported third-party apps. It can be manually turned on or set to automatically switch between light and dark modes based on the time of day.

The volume indicator was redesigned, replacing the larger, centered overlay with a slimmer bar shown vertically near the volume keys in portrait orientation, or at the top in landscape. The bar can also be manipulated directly.

The card UI elements from Apple Music, Apple Podcasts, and Apple Books has been implemented system-wide, being an option for third-parties to use in their apps.

Siri 
Siri uses a software-generated voice called "Neural TTS", intended to sound more natural than previous versions that use clips of human voices. Siri also became more functional and new sound control is available. The Siri Shortcuts app is installed by default. Siri also uses HomePod to learn and recognize voices of different people. It is also possible for Siri to automatically read incoming messages aloud on AirPods.

Keyboard 
The QuickType virtual keyboard features QuickPath, allowing the user to swipe their finger across the keyboard to complete words and phrases. This functionality was previously exclusively available via third-party keyboard applications such as SwiftKey, Adaptxt, Gboard, or Swype. Emoji stickers have been included on the emoji keyboard and can be used wherever regular emoji can be.

Text editing 
iOS 13 and iPadOS 13 add a new system-wide gesture interface for cut, copy, paste, undo, and redo. A three-finger swipe left or up will undo; three fingers right or down will redo. A single three-finger pinch will copy, a second three-finger pinch will cut, and a three-finger spread pastes. A three-finger single tap will bring up a shortcut menu with all five options.

The blue text cursor can be moved around text fields by pressing and holding to pick it up and move it. Many new options for text selection have also been added: double-tapping a word will select it, triple-tapping selects a sentence, and quadruple-tapping a paragraph selects it.

Sign in with Apple 

A new single sign-on service known as "Sign in with Apple" is integrated with iOS 13, and allows users to create accounts for third-party services with a minimal amount of personal information. Users may optionally generate a disposable email address for each account, improving privacy and anonymity, and reducing the amount of information that can be associated with a single email address.

All iOS applications that support third-party social login are required to implement Sign in with Apple, The iOS human interface guidelines also state that Sign in with Apple should be given prominence above any other login provider in application interfaces.

Performance 
iOS 13 contains several performance improvements. Face ID unlocks the iPhone X, XS / XS Max, and XR up to 30% faster than on iOS12. A new file format makes app downloads as much as 50% smaller, app updates as much as 60% smaller, and app launches up to twice as fast.

Battery lifespan extender 
Similar to many laptops, iOS 13 has a feature to limit the battery charging percentage to 80%.

Keeping the battery percentage more centered instead of complete charges and discharges reduces strain onto the battery. This reduces the battery aging of the lithium-ion battery and extends its lifespan.

Haptics 
iOS 13 introduced a new Core Haptics framework. Prior to iOS 13, apps could only provide the default haptic patterns. Core Haptics gives developers more fine-grained control over the iPhone's Taptic Engine, including synchronized audio, allowing apps to provide customized haptic and audio feedback. This feature is only available on iPhone 8 or newer. It is also not supported on the iPod Touch due to the lack of a haptic motor in those devices.

External storage 
iOS 13 introduced the ability to connect to external USB drives.  Although primarily designed for thumb drives and hard drives, a wide variety of USB disk devices will work, thanks to the iOS's support of the SCSI subclass of USB Mass Storage.  Native SCSI disk devices will work as well, when used with a SCSI to USB adapter.

Exposure Notification API 
On 20 May 2020, Apple released iOS 13.5, which includes the Exposure Notification API that provides access to the Apple / Google privacy-preserving contact tracing system that Apple have developed jointly with Google. This is provided to support digital contact tracing which came to light during the COVID-19 pandemic.

ARKit 3 
ARKit 3 was released as a part of iOS 13 and brought new features, such as People occlusion, which allowed AR objects to be in front or behind people in a more realistic way. New features were restricted to devices with A12 processors and newer – like iPhone XS, iPhone XR, and the 2018 iPad Pro. Other features of ARKit 3 were multiple face tracking and collaborative sessions.

ARKit 3.5 
Released with the 2020 iPad Pro, ARKit 3.5 vastly improved positioning in virtual environments due to new anchors and use of data from a LiDAR scanner. It also improved its motion capture and people occlusion.

Other changes 
The version of iOS for iPad devices was renamed iPadOS, reflecting the precedence for the OS to include additional features intended primarily for use on tablets.

iOS13 adds official support for the Sony DualShock 4 and the Microsoft Xbox One controller. iOS13 also adds support for wireless audio sharing for AirPods and certain Beats headphones.

A new multi-select gesture is available in supported applications such as Files and Mail. Multiple items, such as files or emails, can be quickly selected by dragging two fingers over the desired items.

App features

Music 
Apple Music now supports real-time synced song lyrics that animate along with the music as they’re being sung, rapped or spoken.  The currently playing line is highlighted in white color. The feature also lets the user skip to a part of a song simply by tapping on the lyric.

Messages and Memoji 
User profiles can be created and Memoji can be used as an iMessage profile picture. All iOS devices with an A9 processor or newer can create custom Memoji. Memoji and Animoji can be used as a sticker in iMessage and other apps; they are also available as regular emoji for use anywhere the emoji keyboard is available. There are a variety of new customization options for Memoji.

Maps 
The Maps app features a redesigned maps UI, featuring more detailed maps, and Look Around, a street level imagery implementation similar to Google Street View.

Reminders 
Redesigned and rebuilt from the ground up with new features such as the ability to suggest when a reminder should be delivered to the user, and the ability to tag contacts so that references to reminders can be surfaced elsewhere, such as in Messages.

Photos 
The Photos app includes a redesigned UI and uses machine learning to auto-hide "clutter" images such as screenshots and documents.

Photos has a redesigned interface showing users photos they took in the past year, month, week and day. This brings all photos to one page and shows users photos based on what their device suggests for them.

Problems 
There were a number of issues following the release of iOS 13, some relating to battery drain, call-dropping, and ringtones not functioning properly, resulting in frequent software updates and patches. Despite the frequency of bug fix releases, the updates have introduced new issues.

Other issues included incorrect artwork for user's playlists.  Users reported the artwork is repeated for some playlists or uses a different picture.

Supported devices 
iOS13 requires 2 GB of RAM. It ended support for all iPhones and iPod touches using an Apple A7 or A8 SoC and devices that shipped with 1 GB of RAM: the iPhone 5S, iPhone 6/6 Plus and iPod touch (6th generation).

The HomePod used iOS 13 as a base for the system software until the release of iOS 13.4, where the base software was changed to tvOS.

To further differentiate features between iPhones and iPads, Apple rebranded the tablet-oriented platform with its own operating system, iPadOS.

iPhone
 iPhone 6S & 6S Plus
 iPhone SE (1st generation)
 iPhone 7 & 7 Plus
 iPhone 8 & 8 Plus

 iPhone X
 iPhone XS & XS Max
 iPhone XR
 iPhone 11
 iPhone 11 Pro & 11 Pro Max
 iPhone SE (2nd generation)

iPod Touch
 iPod Touch (7th generation)

HomePod
 HomePod

Release history 

See Apple's main page for iOS 13 release notes, as well as their 2019 and 2020 security update contents.

References

External links 
 Official website

13
2019 software
Products introduced in 2019
Mobile operating systems
Proprietary operating systems